Granby island is a small island located in White Bay in the Canadian province of Newfoundland and Labrador. The nearest settlement is Pollards Point.  The island last recorded a population of 38 in 1971, after which the remaining settlers moved to either the western side of Baie Verte peninsula or the eastern side of the Great North Peninsula.

See also
List of islands of Newfoundland and Labrador

References

Islands of Newfoundland and Labrador